"Page One" is a song by Australian singer songwriter Katie Noonan and the Captains. It was released on 19 February 2010  and is included on the album Emperor's Box.

"Page One" was a wedding present to Captain’s keyboardist Stu and his wife Ashlie. A music video was released to promote the song.

Track listings
 "Page One" (Don Walker, Cameron Deyell, Katie Noonan)
 "Time" (Noonan)
 "Radar"	(Andy Stochansky, Declan Kelly, Stu Hunter, Cameron Deyell, Katie Noonan)
 "Jóga" (Björk Gudmundsdottir, Sigurjon B. Sigurdsson)
 "Page One" (Walker, Deyell, Noonan)

 Tracks 3 to 5 are recorded live at Electric Avenue.

Charts

References

External links

2010 songs
2010 singles
Sony Music Australia singles
Songs written by Don Walker (musician)
Songs written by Katie Noonan